Leguizamón is a surname. Notable people with the surname include:

Luis Lezama Leguizamón Sagarminaga, Spanish industrialist and politician
Manuel Lezama Leguizamón Sagarminaga, Spanish industrialist and politician
Juan Manuel Leguizamón, Argentine rugby player
Leandro Leguizamón, Argentine footballer
Luciano Leguizamón, Argentine footballer
María Leguizamón, Argentine politician
Martiniano Leguizamón, Argentine writer
Nicolás Leguizamón (born 1995), Argentine footballer
Oscar Leguizamón (born 1966), Argentine footballer